Thomas Leonard Pardoe (13 January 1912 – 7 December 1992) was an English boxer who competed for Great Britain in the 1932 Summer Olympics and fought as Tommy Pardoe.

Boxing career

Amateur record
As an amateur Pardoe a five times champion of Britain winning the Amateur Boxing Association British flyweight title, when boxing out of the Metropolitan ABC during the years 1929, 1930, 1931, 1932 and 1933.

At the 1930 British Empire Games he won the silver medal in the flyweight class after losing the final to Jacob Smith.

Two years later in 1932 he finished fourth at the 1932 Olympic Games in the flyweight class after losing the bronze-medal bout by walkover to Louis Salica of the United States.

1932 Olympic record

 Round of 16: bye
 Quarterfinal: defeated Kiyonobu Murakami (Japan) on points
 Semifinal: lost to Francisco Cabañas (Mexico) on points
 Bronze Medal Bout: lost to Louis Salica (USA) by walkover

Professional career
He turned professional and on 11 December 1933 won his first fight with Bert Kirby, whom he again defeated on 12 March 1934 in the British (Southern Area) Flyweight Title. On 11 June 1934, he beat Joe Mendiola and then fought Benny Lynch 15 April 1935.

He put up a tremendous fight against Lynch in an eliminator for British Flyweight title, winning five of the last six rounds, but bearing in mind Lynch’s superior experience (82 professional fights), he was knocked out in the fourteenth round. This fight seemed to spell the end of Pardoe’s professional career; he had a further seven fights, but did not win another professional fight.

Personal life
Tommy Pardoe was born on 14 April 1911 and lived at 8 Church Walk, Ward End Birmingham, one of fifteen children. He died 7 December 1992.

External links
profile

References

1912 births
1992 deaths
Boxers from Birmingham, West Midlands
English male boxers
Flyweight boxers
Olympic boxers of Great Britain
Boxers at the 1932 Summer Olympics
Boxers at the 1930 British Empire Games
Commonwealth Games silver medallists for England
Commonwealth Games medallists in boxing
Medallists at the 1930 British Empire Games